Adamowitz may refer to:
A former name of Adamowice, Opole Voivodeship, Poland
A former name of Adamowice, Silesian Voivodeship, Poland
Kolonie Adamowitz former name of Farska Kolonia, Poland